Anthony Wayne Beasley (born December 5, 1966) is an American professional baseball coach. He is the third base coach for the Texas Rangers of Major League Baseball (MLB). He previously served as an interim manager for the Texas Rangers and third base coach and minor-league manager in the Pittsburgh Pirates and the Washington Nationals organizations.

Career
Primarily a middle infielder, Beasley spent nine seasons as a player in the minor leagues and batted .260 with 22 homers and 242 RBI in 854 games. He was originally selected by the Baltimore Orioles in the 19th round of the 1989 June draft before being acquired by Pittsburgh in a deal for infielder Tommy Shields in September 1991. In his minor league career, Beasley was named to the Carolina League All-Star team in both 1990 and 1991. He also garnered Southern League All-Star laurels in 1996.

Beasley began his managerial career with the Williamsport Crosscutters in 2001 and led the club to a 46-26 regular season record and a first-place finish; the club was declared co-champions of the New York–Penn League along with Brooklyn. He was named Low Class-A Manager of-the-Year by Baseball America in consecutive seasons with the Hickory Crawdads in 2002-03 and to the South Atlantic League's mid-season All-Star squad in 2003. Beasley guided the Crawdads to the SAL championship and the fifth-best record in the minors in 2002 and was also selected to the leagues post-season All-Star Team.

Beasley has spent four seasons as a coach at the Major League level. In 2006, he worked as the third-base coach for the Nationals under manager Frank Robinson. He then returned to the Pittsburgh Pirates' organization, where he had spent nearly all of his career to that point, spending the 2007 season as the Pirates' Minor League Infield Coordinator, a role in which he was instrumental in prospect Neil Walker's transition from catcher to third base during spring training. The following year Beasley returned to major-league coaching as the third-base coach on manager John Russell's staff, and he continued in that role until the end of the 2010 season.  In total, Beasley spent 18 years with the Pittsburgh organization.

Beasley spent five seasons as a manager in the Pirates' farm system, guiding his club to the post-season in all five years and a combined record of 372-258 (.590 winning pct.) during the regular season. He was tabbed by Baseball America as the Double-A Manager-of-the-Year in 2004 after guiding Altoona to the Eastern League championship series (his team lost to New Hampshire). Beasley also served the United States National Team as a coach at the MLB Futures Game in Houston during All-Star week in 2004.

In , Beasley returned to the Nationals as manager of the Double-A Harrisburg Senators; then, in –, he skippered Washington's top affiliate, the Syracuse Chiefs of the Triple-A International League.  The following year, in 2014, Beasley was the co-field-coordinator of instruction in the Washington Nationals' minor-league system.

In addition to his regular season managerial duties, Beasley also managed the Mesa Desert Dogs during the Arizona Fall League in 2004, guiding the club to an 18-13 record and a first-place finish in the National Division (his club lost out to the Mesa Solar Sox in the Championship Series). After serving as a player/coach for the AA Carolina Mudcats and the Class A Lynchburg Hillcats in 1998, Beasley began his full-time coaching career as the Hitting Coach with the GCL Pirates in 1999. He worked in the same capacity with Lynchburg in 2000.

Personal life
On February 19, 2016, Beasley was diagnosed with rectal cancer, forcing him to miss the start of the 2016 season. He was declared cancer-free in December 2016 and returned to his position as third base coach in 2017.

Teams
As third base coach'''
Washington Nationals (2006) Wore #29
Pittsburgh Pirates (2008 – 2010) Wore #29 in 2008–2009 & wore #10 in 2010
Texas Rangers (2015 – August 15, 2022) Wears #27

As interim manager
Texas Rangers (2022 – August 15, 2022) Wears #27

On Wednesday, July 30, 2008 before the game against the Colorado Rockies, Tony Beasley performed the national anthem at the Pirates' home stadium, PNC Park.

Managerial record

References

External links

1966 births
Living people
African-American baseball coaches
African-American baseball players
American expatriate baseball players in Canada
Baseball coaches from Virginia
Baseball players from Virginia
Buffalo Bisons (minor league) players
Calgary Cannons players
Carolina Mudcats players
Erie Orioles players
Frederick Keys players
Liberty Flames baseball players
Major League Baseball third base coaches
Pittsburgh Pirates coaches
Salem Buccaneers players
Sportspeople from Fredericksburg, Virginia
Syracuse Chiefs managers
Texas Rangers coaches
Texas Rangers managers
Washington Nationals coaches